Valbray is a Swiss watch company co-founded by Côme de Valbray and Olga Corsini in 2009.  The brand's collection is based on a patented, camera-shutter-like dial system called Oculus that enables indications, mechanisms or art on the dial to be displayed or concealed by rotating the bezel.

Valbray history 
Côme de Valbray was born in 1980 in Paris, France. He received his baccalaureate in Paris, after which he moved to Switzerland to study engineering at the Swiss Federal Institute of Technology in Lausanne. He graduated with a degree in microtechnology, after which he continued studies in business at Harvard. He returned to Europe to take a job with Cartier Horlogerie, where he analyzed watch manufacturing processes until he co-founded Valbray. Valbray was, and is, an enthusiastic photographer who has used Leica Cameras for many years.

Olga Corsini was born in 1979 in Florence, Italy. She graduated with a degree in jewelry design from the European Institute of Design in Milan after which she joined Bulgari in Rome in 2003, where she worked on both unique and collection jewelry pieces. This was followed by a stint at Gucci in Florence (Italy) and Chaumet in Paris, where she worked in watches and jewelry from 2007 until she co-founded Valbray.

The pair founded independent watch brand Valbray near Lausanne, Switzerland in March 2009. The premise of Valbray's collection was to incorporate an element into the dial of a watch that was similar to the shutter of a camera. Valbray invented and designed the mechanism over two years and called it the "Oculus". The Oculus dial comprises 16 single blades, 0.05mm in height, that changes the look of the dial by covering and uncovering it. It is manually opened and closed by rotating the watch's bezel. It was patented in 2010, the same year that the Valbray brand first exhibited four prototypes at the Baselworld watch fair.

In May 2013, Valbray opened its new factory location in Romanel sur Morges, Switzerland. The factory contains several CNC machines and other machinery needed for component production, as well as watchmakers to carry out assembly.

By 2014, Valbray employed 12 people. While it does not manufacture its own movements, Valbray does master in-house fabrication of the case, hands, dial, and unique shutter element as well as strap attachment systems.

Valbray's collection comprises the Oculus V01 Chronograph housed in a 46 mm case and the Oculus V02 Grand Dateur housed in a 43 mm case. They are powered by automatic Swiss Made movements.

Collection 
The Valbray collection comprises the Oculus V01 Chronograph in a 46 mm case, Oculus V02 Grand Dateur in a 43 mm case as well as special editions. All of Valbray's timepieces feature Swiss Made, Automatic watch movements.

Valbray EL 1 Chrono for Leica Camera 

Leica Camera celebrated its 100-year anniversary in May 2014 with the inauguration of a brand-new factory building housed within a complex called the Leitz Park, a number of special new camera products, and the introduction of the Valbray EL 1 Chrono, which represents Leica's first foray into wristwatch collaboration. EL stands for Ernst Leitz, who was one of the founders of Leica.

The bezel on the Valbray EL 1 Chrono was developed to mimic the look and feel of adjusting the focal distance on the lens of a Leica using Valbray's own Oculus diaphragm, which comprises 16 single blades and acts as a cover for the dial. It is opened and closed by turning the rotating bezel found on the 46 mm titanium case. The time display is readable whether the Oculus is opened or closed, while the chronograph displays are hidden by it when it is closed.

The flange and dial also imitate a Leica lens using font and stylistic elements, while the color scheme utilizes Leica's corporate colors, and the date (at 3 o’clock), chronograph minute counter (at 12 o’clock) and chronograph hour counter (at 6 o’clock) recall the layout of the setting controls on a Leica. The running seconds at 9 o’clock recreate the camera's isometrics button. The stylistic element "4.5" located at 4:30 on the dial (visible only when the Oculus is open) is reminiscent of the aperture of the first Leica camera from 1914. The sapphire crystal on the case back is smoked, an element designed to symbolize the dark room in which early photographs were developed. The crown is embossed with the Leica logo.

EL 1 Chrono was limited to 100 pieces: 50 in a titanium case and 50 with a black DLC (diamond-like carbon) finish.

References 

Watch brands
Luxury brands
Watch manufacturing companies of Switzerland
Swiss companies established in 2009
Manufacturing companies established in 2009